Attorney General Scott may refer to:

Henry Milne Scott (1876–1956), Attorney General of Fiji
Ian Scott (Ontario politician) (1934–2006), Attorney General of Ontario
John Scott, 1st Earl of Clonmell (1739–1798), Attorney General for Ireland
John Scott, 1st Earl of Eldon (1751–1838), Attorney General for England and Wales
R. Taylor Scott (1834–1897), Attorney General of Virginia
Thomas Scott (Canadian judge) (1746–1824), Attorney General of Upper Canada
William J. Scott (Illinois politician) (1926–1986), Attorney General of Illinois

See also
General Scott (disambiguation)